The Charles Chamberlain House was a historic house at 373 Pleasant Street in Worcester, Massachusetts.  Built in 1876, it was one of the city's finest examples of residential Victorian Gothic architecture.  It was  added to the National Register of Historic Places in 1980,  but was demolished in 1984.

Description and history
The Charles Chamberlain House was located west of downtown Worcester, on the south side of Pleasant Street between the city's Pleasant and Winslow Park, and the Worcester Seventh-Day Adventist Church, which it shared its lot with.  It was a -story wood-frame structure, with an L-shaped plan covered by gabled roofs.  Its Victorian detailing was an eclectic mix, with spindled Stick style bargeboard in its gables, vertical board siding, a porch supported by delicate turned posts with foliate capitals, and decorated gable aprons.  Sash windows were set in rectangular openings topped by lintels with peaked gables, and sills supported by small brackets.

Charles Chamberlain, the first recorded owner, was the owner of a blade manufacturing firm, which also manufactured and repaired lawn mowers and other small machinery.  The house was probably moved on its lot sometime between 1922 and 1938, in order to make room for the construction of the adjacent church.  The house was demolished in 1984; the site is now used for church parking.

See also
National Register of Historic Places listings in northwestern Worcester, Massachusetts
National Register of Historic Places listings in Worcester County, Massachusetts

References

Houses in Worcester, Massachusetts
Gothic Revival architecture in Massachusetts
Houses completed in 1876
Demolished buildings and structures in Massachusetts
National Register of Historic Places in Worcester, Massachusetts
Houses on the National Register of Historic Places in Worcester County, Massachusetts
Buildings and structures demolished in 1984